The 2019 GB Pro-Series Shrewsbury was a professional tennis tournament played on indoor hard courts. It was the twelfth edition of the tournament which was part of the 2019 ITF Women's World Tennis Tour. It took place in Shrewsbury, United Kingdom between 11 and 17 February 2019.

Singles main-draw entrants

Seeds

 1 Rankings are as of 4 February 2019.

Other entrants
The following players received wildcards into the singles main draw:
  Naomi Broady
  Freya Christie
  Francesca Jones
  Maia Lumsden

The following player received entry using a protected ranking:
  Lina Gjorcheska

The following player received entry from a special exempt:
  Harmony Tan

The following players received entry from the qualifying draw:
  Jodie Anna Burrage
  Ulrikke Eikeri
  Amandine Hesse
  Jessika Ponchet
  Shérazad Reix
  Kimberley Zimmermann

The following players received entry as lucky losers:
  Myrtille Georges
  Laura Robson

Champions

Singles

 Vitalia Diatchenko def.  Yanina Wickmayer, 5–7, 6–1, 6–4

Doubles

 Arina Rodionova /  Yanina Wickmayer def.  Freya Christie /  Valeria Savinykh, 6–2, 7–5

References

External links
 2019 GB Pro-Series Shrewsbury at ITFtennis.com
 Official website

2019 ITF Women's World Tennis Tour
2019 in English tennis